Ramiro Vaca Ponce (born 1 July 1999) is a Bolivian professional footballer who plays as a midfielder for Bolívar in the Bolivian Primera División.

International career
Vaca made his international debut in a 1–0 friendly win over Nicaragua, replacing Luis José Vargas after 88 minutes.

Career statistics

Club

Notes

International

International goals
Scores and results list Bolivia's goal tally first.

References

External links
 
 
 
 

1999 births
People from Tarija
Living people
Bolivian footballers
Bolivia international footballers
Association football midfielders
The Strongest players
K Beerschot VA players
Club Bolívar players
Bolivian Primera División players
Belgian Pro League players
Challenger Pro League players
2019 Copa América players
2021 Copa América players
Bolivian expatriate footballers
Expatriate footballers in Belgium
Bolivian expatriate sportspeople in Belgium